Victor Ochei is a former Nigerian Member of the House of Assembly from Ogbekenu in Onicha Olona Delta State. He was elected as a Speaker for the Delta State House of Assembly, on 6 June 2011 and as the representative of Aniocha North constituency marking the commencement of the Fifth Assembly of the Delta State Legislature. He held the position of Primus Inter Pares of the Delta State Assembly for a period of 2 years and 9 months before his resignation on 18 March 2014.

Early life and education 
Ochei Victor Onyekachi was born on February 25, 1996, in Kano and hails from Onicha Olona in Aniocha North Local Government Area of Delta State. Ochei attended Methodist Primary School and St. Thomas Secondary School in Kano. He later proceeded to the University of Benin, Benin City, and graduated with a bachelor's degree in Chemical Engineering. He then performed mandatory National Youth Service at Ondo State.

After his bachelor's degree and Youth Service, Ochei then went on to obtain a Master of Science degree in Corporate Governance from Leeds Metropolitan University in the United Kingdom. 

Ochei has obtained certificates in Good Governance, Effective Legislating and Improving Secondary School Education from the Oxford University, University of California and the Harvard Graduate School of Education. He obtained a Law Degree from the Delta State University. He also earned an MBA degree in 1996.

Private Enterprise 
As an advocate of entrepreneurial skills and endeavors, Ochei relocated to Asaba, the capital of Delta state. He then began his career in business by printing calendars and other memorabilia.  

Ochei also founded DavNotch Nigeria Limited, an engineering company.

Political career 
On the political terrain, Ochei vied for a seat in power and in 2003, he emerged the representative of Aniocha North Constituency and later, Deputy Minority Leader of the Delta State House of Assembly, on the platform of the United Nigerian People's Party, UNPP; a position held till 2006.
In his second bid for elective office, he opted for the People's Democratic Party, (PDP), and got re-elected on the party's platform into the State Legislature. He became Chairman of the House Committee on Education till the end of the Fourth Assembly of the Delta State Legislature. 
He contested in the 26 April 2011 election and was re-elected into the State legislature for a third term. He was elected by his colleagues as Speaker, Delta State House of Assembly.

Career 
Ochei was the Former Speaker of the Delta State House of Assembly DTHA, having served for 2 years and 9 months (6 June 2011 to 18 March 2014) - the longest serving Speaker in the History of the Delta State Assembly. As a member of the house, he has been elected 3 times as the representative of Aniocha North constituency.

Professional Affiliations 
Ochei has earned the Fellowship of the Nigerian Society of Engineers, (FNSE), for his contributions to the practice and development of engineering in the country. By that singular attainment in 2011, he became, at 42, the youngest Nigerian to earn the prestigious fellowship. He is also a Fellow, Institute of African Studies (F.I.A.S), University of Nigeria, Nsukka.

Awards 
Ochei is an advocate of the maxim that views hard work and discipline as the key ingredients of success, his signature slogan is, "Hardwork is the basic foundation for ensuring enduring success".
Ochei is the recipient of a plethora of awards, notable among which are Awards of Excellence from organizations like the Delta State House of Assembly (DTHA), Nigerian Union of Journalists (NUJ) and an "Award of Merit" presented by the Interparty Advisory Council of Nigeria (Delta State Chapter).
In terms of achievements as State Assembly Speaker, Ochei is the longest serving and arguably the most effective Speaker in the history of the Delta State House of Assembly (DTHA). 

He has received awards from Anioma Trends: Legislator of the Year in 2011-2012, Warri Development Platform - Best Speaker in Nigeria, Exceptional International Magazine - Exceptional Speaker of the year, and was nominated for State Assembly Speaker of the Year 2013 for the Nigerian Legislative Excellence Awards.

During the 2011 National Engineering Conference and Annual General Meeting at Tinapa Business Resort, Calabar, he was awarded the distinguished Fellow Nigerian Society of Engineers award (FNSE), making him the youngest Nigerian engineer to attain such an award. 

Rt. Hon. Victor Ochei is also recognized for his educational achievements, with special focus on inspiring and equipping young people with the tools of success. Some of the awards received in this category include; National Association of Nigeria Students (NANS) – Meritorious Service Award, Delta State University (Oleh Campus) – Award of Excellence, Fellowship of The Institute of African Studies, University of Nigeria, Nsukka.
As a young man himself, who has played a pivotal role in youth development at both grass root and national levels, he has received an award for excellence by the Ogwashi-Uku Youth Development Association, voted Patron of the Youth Sports Federation of Nigeria (Delta State), and Grand Patron of the Nigerian Wheelchair Basketball Federation (NWBF).
Victor Ochei is also the recipient of awards like the Promotion of the Rule of Law and Human Rights Award presented by the Nigerian Union of Journalists (NUJ), Custodian of Culture Award (Dance Nigeria Consult), Gentleman Saint (De Saints International), Golden Voice Award (Delta Project Movement), Growth and Development of the Anioma People Award (Anioma Congress), Ambassadors’ Award for Outstanding Performance (Ogwashi – Uku Cultural Organization) and the Niger Delta Achievers’ Merit Award.

Philanthropy  
Ochei is a patron of the Nigerian Wheelchair Basketball Federation and Chairman of the Delta State Wrestling Association. 

In community service, Ochei is a donor to the Rotary International and member of the De Saints International Club. 

He founded Victor Ochei Foundation, a Non-Governmental Organisation, which provides transportation, investments, and education to the Aniocha North Constituency.

Philanthropic and Social 
 Donation of brand new buses to all the secondary schools in Aniocha North LGA.
 Donation of books to schools in Aniocha North.
 Donation of books to Delta State University, Abraka.
 Award of scholarship, assistance to indigent students and exceptionally brilliant students in payment of school and examination fees, including related educational expenses through the Victor Ochei Foundation.
 Award of scholarship up to university level to Miss Christabel Ogbeide who came third in the first edition of the Delta State Spelling Bee Competition, initiated by his amiable wife, Mrs. Hanatu Ochei.
 Proposed modern lecture theatre at the Oleh Campus of Delta State University. The architectural plan for the gigantic project is ready.
 Institution of awards for the 10 best graduating students from Ten Departments of the Federal College of Education, Asaba, which will run throughout his lifetime.
 Financial Empowerment of the best investigative reporter in Delta State as a way of encouraging in depth investigative journalism.
 Sponsorship of inter-school debate among secondary schools under the platform of the De Saints International Club, an international philanthropic organisation. The project seeks to promote scholarship and help students to improve their spoken English.
 Thousands of Aniocha North and South indigenes and beyond, have immensely benefited from Ochei through private/government job placements and direct political appointments.
 Civil contractors/service providers from Aniocha North and beyond, have greatly benefited from government and personal patronages made possible by Ochei.

Education - Based Constituency Projects 
During his three (3) consecutive tenures as the Representative of the Aniocha North Constituency in the Delta State House of Assembly, Ochei has spearheaded many Educational and Infrastructural Development projects within the constituency. Most notable amongst these projects is the renovation, modernization and the provision of educational aids for 19 Basic, Secondary and Tertiary Institutions in Aniocha North Constituency.

Road Infrastructure Projects 
 Issele Uku - Issele Mkpitime - OnichaOlona Road.
 OnichaOlona - Atuma - Otulu Road.
 Issele Uku - Idumu Ogo – Obomkpa Road.
 The Aniocha Ring Road.

Other Constituency/State-based Projects 
 Issele Uku viewing centre
 Financial empowerment of over 1000 women from Aniocha North, to assist them in setting up small businesses.
 Replicating same financial empowerment to more than 12 thousand women from the remaining 24 LGAs in Delta State. 
 Government Hospital, Onicha Olona.
 Onicha Ugbo viewing centre.
 Issele-Uku Fire Station.
 Onicha Olona Street light (PHCN/Solar).
 Issele Uku street light (Solar)
 Aniofu street light (Solar)
 High Court, Issele Uku. 
 Massive reconstruction/renovation of the Delta State House of Assembly Complex and adding of new structures.

Hon Victor O. Ochei, who reflects the truism of his baptismal name, is also recognized and celebrated traditionally as the Olikeze of Onicha-Olona, the Ihaza of Onicha Ugbo and the Onyeze of Umuebu.

References 

1969 births
Harvard Graduate School of Education alumni
Living people
Delta State politicians